Lee Da-hae (born April 19, 1984) is a South Korean actress.

Television series

Television show

Music video

Hosting

References

South Korean filmographies